Gadolinium yttrium aluminium garnet, usually abbreviated Gd:YAG, is a variation of Nd:YAG with microwave and laser applications.

References

Synthetic minerals
Laser gain media
Gadolinium compounds
Yttrium compounds
Aluminium compounds